Urostrophus gallardoi is a species of lizard in the family Leiosauridae. It is native to Argentina and Bolivia.

References

Urostrophus
Reptiles of Chile
Reptiles described in 1991
Taxa named by Richard Emmett Etheridge
Taxa named by Ernest Edward Williams